The Sweetwater Sports were a minor league baseball team based in Sweetwater, Texas. In 1947 and 1948, the Sports played exclusively as members of the Class D level Longhorn League, qualifying for the 1947 playoffs. Hosting home games at City Park, the Sports evolved to continue play as the Sweetwater Swatters in 1949.

History
The Sports were preceded in minor league play by the 1922 Sweetwater Swatters, who ended a tenue of playing as members of the Class D level West Texas League.

Minor league baseball resumed in Sweetwater in 1947, when the Sweetwater "Sports" became charter members of the six-team Class D level Longhorn League. The Ballinger Cats, Big Spring Broncs, Midland Indians, Odessa Oilers and Vernon Dusters joined Sweetwater in beginning Longhorn League play on April 23, 1947.

In their first season of play, the Sports qualified for the Longhorn League playoffs. With a 63–67 record, Sweetwater placed fourth in the Longhorn League regular season, reaching the four-team playoffs. The Big Spring Broncs defeated Sweetwater in seven games in their first round series. Managed by Ronald Murphy, the Sports finished 18.5 games behind first place Big Spring in the regular season standings. Sports' player Bob Cowsar led the Longhorn with 37 home runs and 176 RBI, while also topping the league with 209 total hits.

In 1948, the San Angelo Colts and Del Rio Cowboys franchises joined the Longhorn League, as the league expanded from six teams to eight teams. The Sweetwater Sports placed sixth in the eight–team league with a 64–76 record, playing under player/manager Clarence Gann and did not qualify for the four-team playoffs. The Sports finished 22.5 games behind the first place Big Spring Broncs in the regular season standings, as the Midland Indians were the eventual league champion. Sweetwater's Kenneth Peacock led the Longhorn League with 34 home runs and 162 RBI. Pitcher Clarence Gann had 207 strikeouts to lead the league. 

In 1949, the franchise renamed, as the Sweetwater Swatters continued play in the Longhorn League.

The ballpark
The Sweetwater Sports hosted minor league home games at City Park. The ballpark was also called "Sportsman's Park". Today, the site is called Newman Park. Newman Park still hosts baseball, along with other amenities and the park is located at 1000 Jack Hazard Drive.

Timeline

Year–by–year records

Notable alumni
No Sweetwater Sports players advanced to the major leagues.

References

External links
Sweetwater - Baseball Reference

Defunct minor league baseball teams
Professional baseball teams in Texas
Defunct baseball teams in Texas
Baseball teams established in 1947
Baseball teams disestablished in 1948
Longhorn League teams
Nolan County, Texas